Mandeville is an unincorporated community in Summers County, West Virginia, United States.

The community derives its name from Joseph Manderville, a local landowner.

References

Unincorporated communities in Summers County, West Virginia
Unincorporated communities in West Virginia